Pero Kvrgić (4 March 1927 – 23 December 2020) was a Croatian actor.

Career
Kvrgić was born in Srpske Moravice to Serb father and Austrian mother. He trained as an actor in the schools of the Croatian National Theatre in Zagreb (HNK) after World War II. 

He joined HNK in 1949, staying until he co-founded the Gavella Drama Theatre in 1953. He returned to HNK in 1986 before he retired in 1988. He continued to act post retirement. His long-standing play Stilske vježbe, a Croatian adaptation of Exercises in Style, is well known and has been produced since 1970, starring Kvrgić and Lela Margitić.

References

1927 births
2020 deaths
Croatian male stage actors
Yugoslav male stage actors
20th-century Croatian male actors
21st-century Croatian male actors

Croatian people of Serbian descent 
Croatian people of Austrian descent
Burials at Mirogoj Cemetery